The 1909 Cork Senior Hurling Championship was the 22nd staging of the Cork Senior Hurling Championship since its establishment by the Cork County Board in 1887. The draw for the opening round fixtures took place on 21 April 1909. The championship began on 9 May 1909 and ended on 25 July 1909.

Blackrock were the defending champions, however, they were beaten by Dungourney at the semi-final stage.

On 25 July 1909, Dungourney won the championship following a 6–10 to 1–8 defeat of Sarsfields in the final. This was their third championship title overall and their first title in two championship seasons.

Results

First round

St. Finbarr's received a bye in this round.

Second round

St Mary's and Sarsfields received byes in this round.

Semi-finals

Final

Miscellaneous
  Sarsfields qualify for the final for the first time.

References

Cork Senior Hurling Championship
Cork Senior Hurling Championship